Corris is a village in the county of Gwynedd, Wales, about  north of the town of Machynlleth. The village lies on the west bank of the Afon Dulas (which here forms the boundary with Powys), around that river's confluence with the Afon Deri. Its railway station is the headquarters and museum of the Corris Railway, a preserved narrow gauge railway.

The area has a community council. The community council system replaced the former parish council system and tackles local issues, acts as a contact point between local government and residents for information and resources on various issues. The community elects one member to represent Corris/Mawddwy ward of Gwynedd Council. Besides Corris, the ward covers Mawddwy community to the north-east.


Notable people
 Rhisiart Morgan Davies (1903–1958) a Welsh physicist.
 John Disley (1928–2016), Olympic medal winning athlete at the 1952 Summer Olympics in the 3000 metres steeplechase.
 Kathy Jones (born 1968), Anglican priest and Dean of Bangor.

Further reading
Slate Quarrying at Corris, by Alun John Richards, 1994,

References

External links

 Corris Railway website
 Corris Institute
 Community Council